Sechin is a Russian masculine surname, its feminine counterpart is Sechina. Notable people with the surname include:

 Igor Sechin (born 1960), Russian politician

Russian-language surnames